Sârbi may refer to the following places in Romania:
Sârbi, Bihor, a commune in Bihor County
Sârbi, a village in Hălmăgel Commune, Arad County
Sârbi, a village in Podu Turcului Commune, Bacău County
Sârbi, a village in Vlăsinești Commune, Botoșani County
Sârbi, a village in Nicorești Commune, Galați County
Sârbi, a village in Ilia Commune, Hunedoara County
Sârbi, a village in Budeşti Commune, Maramureș County
Sârbi, a village in Fărcașa Commune, Maramureș County
Sârbi, a village in Sâg Commune, Sălaj County
Sârbi, a village in Banca Commune, Vaslui County
Sârbi, a village in Șușani Commune, Vâlcea County
Sârbi, a village in Țifești Commune, Vrancea County
Sârbi (Mureș), a tributary of the Mureș in Hunedoara County
Sârbi (Valea Neagră), a tributary of the Valea Neagră in Neamț County

See also
Sarbi (disambiguation)